Wild hops is a common name for several plants

Wild hops may refer to:
 Wild growing forms of plants in the hop genus (Humulus) which may be used for flavoring beer
 Clematis virginiana, a vine native to the eastern United States
 Flemingia strobilifera, native to eastern Asia